Alan Charles Harrington (17 November 1933 – 23 December 2019) was a Welsh professional footballer and Wales international. Harrington played his entire professional career at Cardiff City where he is regarded as one of the club's all-time greats.

Career

Born in Penarth, Harrington joined Cardiff City from local side Cardiff Nomads in 1951. He made his debut midway through the following season in a 0–0 draw with Tottenham Hotspur. He went on to hold a position in the first-team squad for the next twelve years, although he missed the entire 1963–64 season due to a broken leg.

He was forced to retire from playing after suffering a second broken leg during a 1–1 against Leyton Orient in January 1966. In later years, Harrington managed Barry Town, steering them to the Welsh Football League championship in 1982–83.

In November 2007 he was awarded an FAW merit award.

References

1933 births
2019 deaths
Sportspeople from Penarth
Welsh footballers
Wales international footballers
Cardiff City F.C. players
English Football League players
Association football defenders